Russell Alfred Ekeblad (August 17, 1946 – December 12, 2018)  was an American bridge player from Portsmouth, Rhode Island and Jupiter, Florida. Ekeblad was born in Evanston, Illinois and was a graduate of Brown University.

Bridge accomplishments

Wins
 North American Bridge Championships (5)
 Silodor Open Pairs (1) 1993 
 Grand National Teams (1) 2002 
 Spingold (3) 1992, 2005, 2009

Runners-up

 North American Bridge Championships
 Blue Ribbon Pairs (1) 1999 
 Grand National Teams (1) 2003 
 Vanderbilt (1) 2008 
 Mitchell Board-a-Match Teams (1) 1997 
 Reisinger (1) 2006

References

1946 births
2018 deaths
American contract bridge players
Brown University alumni
People from Jupiter, Florida
People from Portsmouth, Rhode Island